Lee Williams may refer to:

Sports
Lee Williams (American football) (born 1962), American football player
Lee Williams (basketball) (1918–1997), American basketball coach and executive
Lee Williams (footballer) (born 1973), English footballer
Lee Williams (golfer) (born 1981), American golfer
Lee Williams (rugby league) (born 1988), Welsh rugby league player
Lee Williams (rugby union) (born 1986), Welsh rugby union player

Others
Lee Williams (actor) (born 1974), British actor and model
Lee Williams (conductor), Canadian rail worker
Lee "Shot" Williams (1938–2011), American soul, soul blues, and R&B singer
Lee Williams and the Spiritual QC's, an American gospel quartet

See also
Lee Williams High School, a high school in Kingman, Arizona